Aqua Duck is a 1963 Warner Bros. Merrie Melodies cartoon directed by Robert McKimson and written by John Dunn. The short was released on September 28, 1963, and stars Daffy Duck.

Plot
Daffy is wandering across a Dalí-style desert. Under the broiling sun he is suffering from hyperthermia and dehydration. He seeks water, but finds a gold nugget instead. A pack rat wants to give him water in exchange for the gold, but Daffy refuses to trade. The desert heat and his thirst take a toll on Daffy's sanity, as he begins imagining that he is in a bar, in a hotel, playing baseball, waiting for the bus, and dancing with a cactus. Finally, Daffy becomes so severely dehydrated that he turns to dust and agrees to surrender the gold after the rat restores him with a drop of water. As he takes a glass of water, a storm swamps him in a flood. For the closing line, he says, "One thing's for sure, when I buy water, I sure get my money's worth!"

References

1963 films
1963 animated films
1963 short films
Merrie Melodies short films
Warner Bros. Cartoons animated short films
1960s English-language films
1963 comedy films
Films directed by Robert McKimson
Daffy Duck films
Films scored by William Lava
1960s Warner Bros. animated short films
Films set in deserts